The Convair C-131 Samaritan is an American twin-engined military transport produced from 1954 to 1956 by Convair. It is the military version of the Convair CV-240 family of airliners.

Design and development
The design began life in a production requirement by American Airlines for a pressurized airliner to replace the Douglas DC-3. Convair's original design had two engines and 40 seats, and thus it was designated the CV-240. The first CV-240 flew on March 16, 1947, and production aircraft were first delivered to American on February 28, 1948. Seventy-five were delivered to American, with another fifty going to Western Airlines, Continental Airlines, Pan American Airways, KLM, Sabena, Swissair and Trans Australia Airlines.

Operational history

The CV-240/340/440 series was used by the United States Air Force (USAF) for medical evacuation and VIP transport and was designated as C-131 Samaritan. The first model Samaritan, the C-131A, was derived from the CV-240 model, and was delivered to the USAF in 1954.

The initial trainer model, designated the T-29, was also based on the Convair CV-240 and was used to instruct USAF navigators for all USAF aircraft and United States Navy (USN) Naval Flight Officers (NFOs) selected to fly land-based aircraft. The first deliveries to the USAF were made in 1950 followed by large production quantities until early 1955. The USAF and the USN operated T-29s in separate units at separate locations until 1976. In 1974, the USAF T-29s with the 323d Flying Training Wing (323 FTW) at Mather AFB, California began to be replaced by the Boeing 737-derived T-43.  In 1975, the Navy retired all of its T-29s assigned to Training Squadron Twenty-Nine (VT-29) at NAS Corpus Christi, Texas, deactivated VT-29, and merged their advanced navigator training program for land-based NFOs with the Air Force's program at Mather AFB.

A planned bomber training version of the T-29 (designated T-32) was never built.

From 1952, the USN and United States Marine Corps (USMC) took delivery of 36 R4Y-1 transport aircraft similar to the commercial CV-340 and USAF C-131D, configured with 44 passenger seats and powered by a pair of  Pratt & Whitney R-2800-52W engines. A single otherwise similar aircraft was acquired with a 24-seat VIP interior and designated R4Y-1Z. In 1957, the USN took delivery of two additional aircraft similar to the commercial CV-440 and designated R4Y-2. With the 1962 redesignation of USN/USMC aircraft, the three types were redesignated as the C-131F, VC-131F, and C-131G respectively. A number of R4Y-1 (C-131F) aircraft were converted to R4Y-1Z (VC-131F) or R4Y-2 (C-131G) standards after delivery, and several C-131F and C-131G aircraft were ultimately sold as military surplus and converted to civil use.

Nearly all of the C-131s left the active USAF inventory in the late 1970s, but the U.S. Coast Guard (USCG) operated the aircraft until 1983, while the Air National Guard (ANG) and USN units operated additional C-131 airframes, primarily as Operational Support Aircraft (OSA) for ANG flying wings and as naval air station "station aircraft" until 1990. The C-131 was primarily replaced by the C-9 Nightingale in regular USAF service, with the ANG replacing their OSA with C-130 Hercules aircraft and the USN with C-12 Hurons.

In 1959, a C-131 was the first aircraft to be used as a reduced-gravity aircraft or 'vomit comet', for astronaut training as part of Project Mercury.

A Samaritan was the first aircraft used as a flying gunship testbed in mid-1963, in a program known as "Project Tailchaser". A C-131B (AF Ser. No. 53-7820) was given a gunsight for the side window, but instead of guns it had cameras in the cargo area. Eventually the C-131 was ferried to Eglin AFB in Florida and a General Electric SUU-11A/A 7.62 mm Gatling-style Minigun was installed. Live ammunition was used and both over-water and overland tests were successful.

Accidents and incidents

On 17 December 1960, a USAF C-131D Samaritan crashed at Munich after one engine lost power on takeoff from Munich-Riem Airport. Flying in heavy fog and unable to gain altitude, the aircraft struck the steeple of St. Paul's Church and crashed onto a tram, killing all 20 people on the aircraft and 32 on the tram.

Variants

C-131A
Transport for USAF based on CV-240, capable of carrying 39 passengers on rearward facing seats, or 20 stretchers and 7 seats; 26 built.
HC-131A
Surplus C-131As transferred to the USCG, 22 transferred.
MC-131A
C-131A used for medivac duties with 27 stretchers.
VC-131A
C-131A used as a staff transport.
C-131B
A hybrid CV-240/340 with seats for 48 passengers, 36 built.
JC-131B
C-131B converted for missile tracking, six conversions.
NC-131B
One C-131B used for permanent testing.
VC-131B
C-131B when used as a staff transport.
YC-131C
Two CV-340s modified with Alison 501D-13 turboprop engines.
C-131D
Military version of the Model 340 with seats for 44 passengers, 33 built.
VC-131D
C-131D when used as a staff transport.
C-131E
Electronic countermeasures (ECM) training version for Strategic Air Command (SAC), later designated TC-131E, 15 built and one conversion from C-131D, two transferred to United States Navy as R4Y-2.
TC-131E
C-131E redesignated.
C-131F
R4Y-1 redesignated.
RC-131F
Conversions for photo-mapping and survey, six conversions.
VC-131F
R4Y-1Z redesignated.
C-131G
R4Y-2 redesignated.
EC-131G
One C-131G modified as an electronics trainer.
RC-131G
One C-131G modified for airways checking duties.
VC-131G
C-131G when used as a staff transport.
C-131H
Conversions to CV-580 turboprop standard.
NC-131H
One conversion with an extended nose incorporating a separate cockpit as a Total In-Flight Simulator. This aircraft was transferred to the National Museum of the United States Air Force at Wright-Patterson AFB, Ohio on November 7, 2008
R4Y-1
USN/USMC version of CV-340 with 44 passenger seats, redesignated C-131F in 1962, 36 built.
R4Y-1Z
USN/USMC 24-seat VIP staff transport, redesignated VC-131F in 1962, one built and conversions from R4Y-1.
R4Y-2
USN/USMC version of CV-440, redesignated C-131G in 1962, two built and conversions from R4Y-1; an additional 13 canceled, of which six were completed as CV-440 airliners.
R4Y-2Q
Proposed ECM version of the R4Y-2, five canceled.
R4Y-2S
Proposed anti-submarine warfare version of R4Y-2, 14 canceled.
XT-29
Prototype military trainer version of the Model 240 for the United States Air Force, two built.
T-29A
Initial production version for navigator training, unpressurized cabin for 14 students, 46 built.
VT-29A
T-29As converted for staff transport.
T-29B
Pressurized version with room for 10 navigator and four radio operator students, 105 built.
NT-29B
One T-29B used for permanent testing.
VT-29B
T-29B converted for staff transport with seating for 29 or 32 passengers.
T-29C
T-29B with  Pratt & Whitney R-2800-29W engines, 119 built.
AT-29C
T-29C modified for airways checking duties, redesignated ET-29C in 1962.
ET-29C
AT-29C redesignated.
VT-29C
T-29C converted to staff transport.
T-29D
Bombardier training version of the T-29C with room for six students, 93 built.
ET-29D
Airways checking conversion of the T-29D.
VT-29D
Staff transport conversion of the T-29D.
XT-29E
Proposed turboprop version of T-29B, none built.
YT-32
Proposed bomber training version with transparent nose, none built.

Operators

Paraguayan Air Force operated one former USAF Convair C-131D

United States Air Force operated T-29 and C-131 aircraft.
United States Navy operated R4Y/C-131 and T-29 aircraft.
United States Coast Guard operated R4Y/C-131 aircraft.
NASA

Surviving aircraft

HC-131A
 52-5794 – On display at the Pueblo Weisbrod Aircraft Museum in Pueblo, Colorado.

C-131A
 55-4757 – On display at the Minnesota Air National Guard Museum in Minneapolis, Minnesota.

C-131B
 53-7811 – Last registered to Tatonduk Outfitters Limited in Fairbanks, Alaska. This aircraft was previously on display at the Kelly Field Heritage Museum, Lackland AFB, Texas.
 53-7819 – Airworthy with Airborne Resources Inc in Midlothian, Texas.
 53-7821 – On display at the Air Force Armament Museum, Eglin AFB, Florida.

C-131D
 54-2806 – On display at the Jimmy Doolittle Air & Space Museum, Travis AFB, California.
 54-2808 – On display at the March Field Air Museum, March ARB (former March AFB), Riverside, California.
 54-2810 – Stored at Burlington Air National Guard Base in Burlington, Vermont.
 54-2822 – On display at the Aerospace Museum of California, former McClellan AFB, California.
 55-0292 – On display at the South Dakota Air and Space Museum, Ellsworth AFB, South Dakota.
 55-0293 – On display at the Selfridge Military Air Museum, Selfridge Air National Guard Base, Michigan.
 55-0294 – On display at The Leonardo in Salt Lake City, Utah.
 55-0295 – On display at the Air Mobility Command Museum, Dover AFB, Delaware.
 55-0300 – On display at the Hill Aerospace Museum, Hill AFB, Utah.
 55-0301 – Cockpit only with unknown owner in Kenosha, Wisconsin. This airframe was previously on display at the National Museum of the United States Air Force, but was scrapped before 2009.

C-131F
 140996 – Airworthy with Gulf & Caribbean Cargo of Waterford, Michigan.
 141008 – Airworthy with Conquest Air Inc of Miami Lakes, Florida.
 141013 – On display at the Yanks Air Museum in Chino, California.
 141015 – On display at the National Museum of Naval Aviation, NAS Pensacola, Florida.
 141017 – On display at the Pima Air & Space Museum in Tucson, Arizona.
 141025 – In storage at the Pima Air & Space Museum in Tucson, Arizona.

NC-131H
 53-7793 – On display at the National Museum of the United States Air Force in Dayton, Ohio.

T-29A
 49-1934 – On display at Sheppard AFB, Texas.
 50-0190 – On display at the Strategic Air and Space Museum in Ashland, Nebraska.

T-29B
 51-7906 – On display at the Pima Air & Space Museum in Tucson, Arizona.

T-29C
 53-3489 – On display at the 12th Flying Training Wing area, Randolph AFB, Texas. (previously displayed at former Mather AFB, California; disassembled and relocated following BRAC closure of Mather AFB)
 52-1175 – On display at the Linear Air Park at Dyess Air Force Base in Abilene, Texas.

Specifications (C-131B)

See also

References
 Notes

 Bibliography

 Andrade, John. Militair 1982. London: Aviation Press Limited, 1982. .
 Frawley, Gerald. "Convair CV-540, 580, 600, 640 & CV5800", The International Directory of Civil Aircraft 1997/98. Fyshwick ACT: Aerospace Publications, 1997. .
 Gradidge, Jennifer. The Convairliners Story. Tonbridge, Kent, UK: Air-Britain (Historians) Ltd, 1997. .
 Swanborough, F. G. and Peter M. Bowers. United States Military Aircraft since 1909. London: Punam, 1963.
 Wegg, John. General Dynamics Aircraft and Their Predecessors. London: Putnam, 1990. .

External links

 Convair 240 – National Air and Space Museum
 C-131 Samaritan factsheet – National Museum of the United States Air Force
 C-131D Samaritan – March Field Air Museum
 C-131 Samaritan – GlobalSecurity.org
 C-131 Samaritan – The Aviation Zone
 Gunships – The Aviation Zone

C-131
1950s United States military trainer aircraft
C-0131 Samaritan
Low-wing aircraft
Aircraft first flown in 1949
Twin piston-engined tractor aircraft
Aircraft related to spaceflight